Jeppson's Malört is a brand of bäsk liquor, extremely low in thujone, introduced in the 1930s, and long produced by Chicago's Carl Jeppson Company. In 2018, as its last employee was retiring, the brand was sold to CH Distillery of Chicago's Pilsen neighborhood. Jeppson's Malört is named after Carl Jeppson, a Swedish immigrant who first distilled and popularized the liquor in Chicago.  (literally moth herb) is the Swedish word for wormwood, which is the key ingredient in a bäsk, a bitter-flavored type of Swedish brännvin.

Malört is known for its bitter taste.  It can be found in some Chicago-area taverns and liquor stores, and is growing in popularity there, but is hard to find elsewhere in the United States.

History
In the 1930s Carl Jeppson, a Swedish immigrant to Chicago, began marketing his homemade brew. He sold it from door to door for medicinal and other purposes, and one legend says he preferred the strong taste because years of smoking had dulled his taste-buds.  Attorney George Brode purchased the original recipe from Jeppson and created the famous Jeppson's Malört testimonial that once appeared on every bottle. Patricia Gabelick was hired by Brode as his secretary in 1966, and took over the business after Brode's death in 1999, running it out of her Lakeview apartment. 

It was made in Chicago until the mid-1970s, when the Mar-Salle distillery that produced it for the Carl Jeppson Company closed. It was then made in Kentucky briefly, after which it was produced in Florida for many years. In 2018, Jeppson's Malört was acquired by Chicago-based CH Distillery, and in 2019 production was moved back to Chicago.

Label
For many years the label on the back of the bottle said:

The label was changed and now it says:

The label contains a shield with a version of the flag of Chicago. Although the city's flag has had four red stars since 1939, the label bears the three red stars of the 1933 flag.

Reputation

While Gabelick acknowledged that the drink is a "niche liquor," selling a comparatively small number of cases annually, it has gained increased relevance among bartenders, bikers, and Chicago's southside community, where Gabelick notes that it has become "a rite of passage." The satirist John Hodgman has also adopted the drink in his stage show, offering shots to his audience.  In an interview with Gothamist blog Chicagoist, John Hodgman said Jeppson's Malört "tastes like pencil shavings and heartbreak."  

For many years, it was only sold in the Chicago area. In summer 2013, Chicago bar Red Door featured Malört–infused snow cones (it has a summer tradition of serving snow cones doused with alcohol). The liquor is mixed with Benedictine and Angostura orange. West Town's Hoosier Mama Pie Co. used Jeppson's in 2017 for "a meringue-style pie", called the Chicago Sunrise.

In Joe Swanberg's 2013 film Drinking Buddies, drinking a shot of Malört is described as a Chicago tradition for erasing past mistakes.  In it, actor Jason Sudeikis' character riffs that Malört is like swallowing a burnt condom filled with gasoline. In a similar vein, Tremaine Atkinson, founder of CH Distillery, was introduced to Malört when he first moved to Chicago, when he compared it to "taking a bite out of a grapefruit and then drinking a shot of gasoline". Malört makes up half of the beer boilermaker called the Chicago Handshake (the other half is an Old Style beer).

In August 2015, the High-Hat Club was voted Best Malört Bar in Chicago and was awarded the Carl Cup, a perpetual trophy that is passed from past to current champions in a manner similar to the Stanley Cup.

While Malört is sometimes mistaken for the common name of the style of liquor, the word is the trademarked brand name owned by Carl Jeppson Company. The company secured the trademark on November 3, 2015. Other distillers that produced a similar spirit renamed theirs beforehand. Letherbee reverted to the generic "Bësk", while FEW Spirits dubbed theirs "Anguish and Regret".

See also
 Snaps
 Absinthe
 Chicago culture
 Piołunówka

References

External links
 
 

Cuisine of Chicago
Bitters
Swedish distilled drinks
Swedish-American culture in Chicago
Food and drink introduced in the 1930s